The Battle of the Cyzicus was fought in October 1303 between the Catalan Company of the East under Roger de Flor, acting as mercenaries on behalf of the Byzantine Empire, and the Ottoman Turks under Osman Gazi. It was the first of several engagements between the two sides during the Catalan Company's Anatolian Campaign against the Ottomans.

The result was a crushing Catalan victory. The almogavars of the Catalan Company made a surprise attack on the Turkish camp located at Erdek, killing about 3000 cavalry and 10,000 infantry and capturing many women and children. Many of the Turkish women and children captured were sold into slavery.

References

Bibliography
 

History of Balıkesir Province
the Cyzicus
1300s in the Byzantine Empire
History of Catalonia